The Desjardins Credit Union was an autonomous Ontario credit union whose creation was funded by the Desjardins Group in a 2003 buyout of the Province of Ontario Savings Office
.

As of 2010, the credit union had 50,000 members and CDN$1.4 billion in assets. 
The company had 19 branches in Ontario and six agencies with a total of approximately 50,000 members.

On June 1, 2011, Desjardins Credit Union merged with Meridian Credit Union.

References

Meridian Credit Union
2003 establishments in Ontario
2011 disestablishments in Ontario
Credit union
Canadian companies established in 2003
2011 mergers and acquisitions
Banks established in 2003
Banks disestablished in 2011